Gunvor Group Ltd is a Cypriot-domiciled multinational commodity trading company registered in Cyprus, with its main trading office in Geneva, Switzerland. Gunvor also has trading offices in Singapore, the Bahamas, and Dubai, with a network of representative offices around the globe. The company operates in the trade, transport, storage and optimization of petroleum and other energy products, as well as having investments in oil terminal and port facilities. Its operations consist of securing crude oil upstream and delivering it to market via pipelines and tankers.

The company, which was founded in 2000, is the fourth largest crude oil trader in the world after Glencore, Vitol, and Trafigura. The company was co-founded and controlled by Gennady Timchenko together with Torbjörn Törnqvist (after whose mother the company is named); however, due to United States sanctions, Timchenko sold his stake in the company to Törnqvist in March 2014.

Gunvor's largest single supplier of crude oil was once Russia, though the company now originates most of its crude oil from the Americas, with less than 13 percent coming from Russia. It also trades African, Asian, and South-American crude and is active on all continents. In 2011, Gunvor was trading less than 20% of Russia's seaborne oil.

Early years
Gennady Timchenko and Torbjörn Törnqvist began working together in 1997, and formalized Gunvor in 2000. In 2003, the company started operations in Geneva.

According to the Financial Times, until 2007 the company was a "niche player" focused on exporting Russian oil through Estonia, relying on the expertise of its two founders in the oil business, Russian market and transit logistics. Torbjörn Törnqvist is a Swedish citizen born in 1953. He has traded oil across the world for over twenty years, beginning his career at BP. Gennady Timchenko is a Finnish citizen born in the Soviet Union in 1952. He has more than 20 years experience in the oil industry, beginning with the Kirishi refinery during perestroika, and was one of the first Russians to export oil to Europe after the Soviet Union collapsed.

In 2007, Gunvor's turnover was US$43 billion, with exports of 83 million tons of oil and petroleum products (up from 60 million tons in 2006). In 2010, the company's turnover grew to US$65 billion, up from US$53 billion in 2009, with volumes increasing to 104 million tons.

Logistics and infrastructures
Gunvor has invested in oil storages facilities, railway transportation as well as port facilities and terminals, therefore ensuring a "comparative advantage over their competitors", according to Törnqvist interviewed by the Financial Times. According to the company website, Gunvor is associated with a railway oil transportation company (Transoil) and owns its own shipping company, Clearlake Shipping Ltd, which shipped 30% of the Baltic crude oil (20.5 million tonnes) in 2006.

According to Nefte Compass, from February 2002 to February 2008, Russian oil exports through Gunvor increased sixteen times. The company controls 60% of the volume transiting through Estonia, and 41% of that transit via the port of Primorsk, Leningrad Oblast.

In 2009, Gunvor made major investments into physical assets such as oil terminals and facilities, the largest being into its oil export terminal in the port of Ust-Luga on the Baltic Sea, outside of St-Petersburg.  In September 2009, the terminal was sold to Transneft.

In September 2009, Gunvor made its first direct investment in oil exploration when it purchased a 30% interest in Lagansky block in the Caspian sea from Lundin Petroleum. The field has proven reserves of over 230 million barrels of oil.

Gunvor also owns three major European refineries which are based in the Netherlands, Belgium and Germany. The Gunvor Petroleum Rotterdam refinery can process 88,000 barrels per day, while the Ingolstadt refinery located in Bavaria can handle 110,000 barrels per day and is supplied by the Transalpine Pipeline from the marine shipping terminal in Trieste, Italy. Gunvor also owns a large refinery with a capacity in excess of 100,000 barrels per day located in the north of the Port of Antwerp.

Expansion
Gunvor has expanded beyond its Russian roots, and trades globally, including in the Middle East, Asia, Africa and the Americas with its main trading hubs located in Geneva, Singapore, Nassau and Dubai. The group has also opened offices in Amsterdam, Moscow, Beijing and Nigeria. Gunvor has stated that it intends to develop its new energy trading division so that it will become a more significant part of a more diversified business.

In 2009, Gunvor established its Global Energy division, focused on trading a broad range of energy commodities including Global Coal and Freight, Emissions and Renewables, Natural Gas and LNG and Power.

The company intends to continue to expand and diversify in 2010, both geographically and across the energy value chain. Marking a new phase in its expansion into the European energy markets, Gunvor entered its first trades in the natural gas, power and carbon markets in January 2010, and extending its trading capability across North West and Central Europe for physical natural gas and coal across the globe.

In April 2010, the company hired traders who take responsibility for Gunvor's physical-gas positions across continental Europe, D. Smith for as a coal trader in 2010, and Fredrik Bodecke who will be responsible for the Nordic and Baltic electricity markets.

Ownership
The real beneficiaries of Gunvor cannot be ascertained. It was said that its two co-founders held an equal number of shares, with the balance being held in an employee benefit trust for senior management. On 20 March 2014 Timchenko was included on the United States' Sanctions list in the wake of the annexation of Crimea by Russia, due to his close ties with Russian President Vladimir Putin. The US Treasury alleged that "Putin has investments in Gunvor and may have access to Gunvor funds," without providing any evidence. Törnqvist bought out Timchenko's 43.5% stake and became the nominal owner of an 87% stake in the company on 19 March 2014. Timchenko explained the sale by "anticipating potential economic sanctions" and to "ensure with certainty the continued and uninterrupted operations of Gunvor Group".  The value of the transaction was not disclosed.

Controversies
In 2008, The Economist mentioned Timchenko in an article that repeated previously published statements about Timchenko and Gunvor. Both of these parties sued for libel. The Economist withdrew the contested material from its website. The lawsuit was settled in July 2009. The Economist published a correcting statement.

Following the major WikiLeaks release of US State Department cables in November 2010, it was reported by the London Daily Telegraph<ref>Daily Telegraph [http://www.telegraph.co.uk/news/worldnews/wikileaks/8175406/WikiLeaks-Putins-secret-billions.html Wikileaks: 'Putin's 'secret billions], Dec 03, 2010</ref> that the wealth of the then Russian Prime Minister Vladimir Putin was linked to a "secretive Swiss-based oil trading firm" called Gunvor. It said that John Beyrle, the United States ambassador to the Russian Federation stated that close connections existed between Gunvor and the Russian Government and that he reported: "its secretive ownership is rumoured to include prime minister Putin." The newspaper went on to report that Gunvor had,  however, totally refuted the existence of any links between it and Putin. Gunvor stated in response to the WikiLeaks disclosure that Timchenko and Törnqvist owned "a large majority of Gunvor" and that a "minority stake is owned by an employee benefit trust".  It went on to say that "the company had taken out credit facilities which require full disclosure of company ownership".

According to the former Chairman of the Russian State Duma Ivan Rybkin, and Russian political scientist Stanislav Belkovsky, who was affiliated to the late Boris Berezovsky (a Russian oligarch-in-exile and a political opponent of Putin), Putin controls (among other investments) 50% in Gunvor, run by Gennady Timchenko, a close friend.Миллиардер Тимченко, "друг Путина", стал одним из крупнейших в мире продавцов нефти. NEWSru.com 1 ноября 2007 г.

In 2017, a Swedish Radio documentary presented evidence that Gunvor had been involved in a Belarusian oil smuggling scheme featuring corruption at the highest levels in the Belarus government.
This documentary won the 2017 Prix Europa award in the "Radio Current Affairs" category.

Gunvor denied any wrongdoing.

In March 2020, The Sunday Times'' published an article based on an 2015 interview with Sergei Pugachev, once known as Kremlin's banker, linking Gunvor to Russian President Vladimir Putin.

In 2019, Gunvor "was condemned by Swiss authorities to pay approximately US$96.7 million for failing to put adequate measures in place to prevent the bribery of foreign government officials in Cote d’Ivoire and the Republic of Congo in exchange for lucrative oil deals." In 2021 Transparency International included this as one of five examples of foreign bribery in "clean" countries in the Corruption Perception Index.

References

Notes

Further reading

 Catherine Belton, Neil Buckley On the offensive: How Gunvor rose to the top of Russian oil trading - Financial Times, May 14, 2008
 Gennady Timchenko Gunvor, Putin and me: the truth about Russian oil trader - Financial Times, May 22, 2008
 An article from Michael J. Economides published by Human Events

External links 
 
 

Companies based in Geneva
Oil and gas companies of Switzerland
Oil and gas companies of Cyprus
Oil traders
Swiss companies established in 2000
Non-renewable resource companies established in 2000
Multinational companies headquartered in Cyprus
Companies based in Nicosia